WLCQ-LP (99.7 FM, "The Q 99.7") is a radio station licensed to serve Feeding Hills, Massachusetts. The station is owned by Lighthouse Christian Center. It airs a Christian Contemporary music format.

The station was assigned the WLCQ-LP call letters by the Federal Communications Commission on June 18, 2005.

FCC troubles
In October 2015, Saga Communications filed a petition to revoke the license of WLCQ-LP under a claim of interference with their Northampton-licensed station WLZX-FM (99.3). Saga accused WLCQ-LP of several technical errors of their license, including operating their transmitter "more than a football field" from the licensed location, as well as changing antennas from a "one bay to a two bay" without prior notification to the commission, among other errors. WLCQ-LP filed to correct the errors with the FCC in November 2015. The status of the objection, construction permit to correct facilities, and special temporary authority have been resolved with the commission as the FCC struck down Saga's complaints.

References

External links

LCQ-LP
Contemporary Christian radio stations in the United States
Radio stations established in 2006
Mass media in Hampden County, Massachusetts
LCQ-LP